All Saints Church a church building in Kortedala in Gothenburg, Sweden. Belonging to the Kortedala Parish of the Church of Sweden, it was officially opened on All Saints Day, 3 November 1956.

References

External links

20th-century Church of Sweden church buildings
Churches in Gothenburg
Churches completed in 1956
Churches in the Diocese of Gothenburg
1956 establishments in Sweden